Fernando Esquivel (born 17 August 1939) is a Costa Rican weightlifter. He competed in the men's middle heavyweight event at the 1968 Summer Olympics.

References

1939 births
Living people
Costa Rican male weightlifters
Olympic weightlifters of Costa Rica
Weightlifters at the 1968 Summer Olympics
People from San Ramón, Costa Rica
20th-century Costa Rican people